Asanada agharkari is a species of small Scolopendrid centipede in the subfamily Scolopendrinae

Appearance 
Asanada agharkari is small, measuring between 13 and 32 mm in length. The antennae have 17 articles, though Gravely initially described the species with 17-18. They are dark reddish-purple in colour, but fade to pale brown or grey when preserved in alcohol.

Subspecies

Asanada agharkari singhbhumensis 
Asanada agharkari singhbhumensis is found in the Singhbhum district, and is distinguishable from A. a. agharkari only by colour; it is grey with a dark line down the middle of its trunk.

Taxonomy 
Asanada agharkari was initially described by Frederic Henry Gravely in 1912 in the seventh volume of the Records of the Indian Museum, a journal based in Calcutta. He gave it the genus name Pseudcryptops (Pocock, 1891), a name which has since been synonymized with Asanada, and also described two subspecies: A. a. agharkari and A. a. singhbhumensis. The last taxonomic review was done in 1978 by Jangi and Dass, in the same paper that synonymized Pseudocryptops with Asanada.

The type specimens are alcohol-preserved at the Zoological Survey of India in Calcutta. There is one adult and one juvenile, both are slightly damaged and have suffered decolourization due to long preservation.

Distribution 
A. agharkari endemic to India and is found the Andaman and Nicobar Islands, as well as the states Bihar, Maharashtra, Odisha (Orissa), and Madhya Pradesh. The type locality (of the lectotype) is Koyna Valley in the Western Ghats, in Satara District in Maharashtra.

References 

Fauna of India
Animals described in 1912
agharkari